Lou Schizas is best known for his work as an equities analyst for the Canadian specialty channel BNN: Business News Network (formerly Report on Business Television) since its launch in September 1999 until August 24, 2007. Schizas claims on his website Happy Capitalism that he analyzed over 16,000 stocks during his time with BNN. He was also a daily contributor to national network CTV’s morning flagship program, Canada AM.

Schizas was an on-air radio personality on Corus Entertainment radio stations AM640 (CFMJ) in Toronto and AM980 (CINW) in London until September 2018 when Corus tried to terminate its relationship with him with an offer of 1 month after 18 years of outstanding business and market analysis. Schizas retained a labour lawyer and successfully settled on 15 months of working notice. This involved working for the Corus station in Hamilton and London. His last day with Corus was December 10 2019. 

Schizas taught finance at the Sheridan College Institute of Technology and Advanced Learning. He was a contributor to globeinvestor.com

Before joining BNN, Schizas was a financial adviser based in Calgary where he sold tax-sheltered investments. He has also written a financial column for the Calgary Sun, hosted a radio program called The Money Manager on AM 1060 CKMX and performed media relations work for community groups.

Schizas holds a Bachelor of Arts in Economics from the University of Western Ontario and did graduate work at the State University of New York at Stony Brook. He also holds Canadian Investment Manager (CIM) designation, and is a Fellow of the Canadian Securities Institute.

Although Schizas is a Canadian citizen, he grew up in New York City. He is the son of a Greek-American father and a French-Canadian mother.

On Thursday August 31, 2017 Mr. Schizas became the first business analyst to provide regular bitcoin quotes on radio during his hourly reports on Talk Radio AM640

External links
 Happy Capitalism website

References

American emigrants to Canada
Canadian television journalists
Canadian people of Greek descent
Journalists from New York City
Living people
University of Western Ontario alumni
Stony Brook University alumni
Year of birth missing (living people)